Acrolophus granulatella is a moth of the family Acrolophidae. It is found in Brazil.

References

Moths described in 1863
granulatella
Fauna of Brazil
Moths of South America
Insects of South America